The Feminist Peace Network (FPN) advocates for the human rights of women and raises awareness about misogyny and the global pandemic of violence against women violence against women.

About 
Feminist Peace Network (FPN) was started in 2001 by Lucinda Marshall. The organization is based in Louisville. FPN advocates and supports the active participation of women and the full reflection of women's needs in the process of conflict resolution and the creation of sustainable peace  and examines many issues including education, health, economics, the environment and media from a gendered lens.

During the Occupy movement, both Code Pink and FPN recruited women to get involved.

References

External links 
 Official site

Violence against women
Peace organizations
Feminist organizations in the United States